Carlos Alberto de Oliveira Júnior (born 24 January 1978 in Rio de Janeiro), or simply Carlos Alberto, is a Brazilian defensive midfielder who currently plays for Joinville Esporte Clube.

He won the 2003 FIFA World Youth Championship, using fake document to claim that he was born on 24 January 1983. Because of this, he was banned for 360 days from football.

Honours
Santa Catarina State League (2nd division): 2002, 2004
World Cup (U 20): 2003
Santa Catarina State League: 2006

References

External links

placar 

Figueirense midfielder banned

1978 births
Living people
Brazil under-20 international footballers
Association football midfielders
Joinville Esporte Clube players
Guarani FC players
Sport Club Corinthians Paulista players
Clube Atlético Mineiro players
Goiás Esporte Clube players
Footballers from Rio de Janeiro (city)
Brazilian footballers